Abilkhan Amankul (born 29 July 1997) is a Kazakh middleweight amateur boxer.  He competed in the middleweight event at the 2020 Summer Olympics.

Career
Amankul was a boxing bronze medallist in the men's middleweight category at the 2017 Asian Amateur Boxing Championships  after being narrowly defeated by Israil Madrimov of Uzbekistan in the semi-finals.

At the 2017 AIBA World Boxing Championships, he beat Campbell Somerville, Silvio Schierle, Olympic and World Champion Arlen López and Kamran Shakhsuvarly. Amankul losing to Oleksandr Khyzhniak of Ukraine in the gold medal match. 

Abilkhan started the 2018 Asian Games with  5-0 win over Aphisit Khankhokkhruea of the Thailand in the first round, and in quarterfinals Amankul wins 5-0 Kan Chia-wei of Taipei and semifinals he wins India’s Vikas Yadav unfortunately has been forced to pull out of the semi-final bout as he has been declared medically unfit due to an injury. Vikas will settle for a bronze. Amankul advanced to the final. In the final, Abilkhan fight Israil Madrimov of  Uzbekistan   and he lost 3-2 and the silver medal. Amankul to compete at the 2020 Olympic Games in Tokyo.

Results

2017 Asian Championships 
Amankul won Bronze in the Asian Championships at Middleweight. Results were:
 Yinhang Wen: Won (5:0)
 Abdul Mouen Azziz: Won (TKO)
 Israil Madrimov: Lost (5:0)

2017 World Championships
Amankul won Silver in the World  Championships at Middleweight. Results were:
 Campbell Somerville: Won (5:0)
 Silvio Schierle: Won (5:0)
 Arlen López: Won (3:2)
 Kamran Shakhsuvarly: Won (4:1)
 Oleksandr Khyzhniak: Lost (5:0)

2018 Asian Games
Amankul won Silver in the Asian Games at Middleweight. Results were:
 Aphisit Khankhokkhruea: Won (5:0)
 Kan Chia-wei: Won (5:0)
 Vikas Yadav: Won (WO)
 Israil Madrimov: Lost (3:2)

Debut Pro Fight
 Devontae McDonald: Won by TKO (R3)

References

1997 births
Kazakhstani male boxers
People from Taraz
Living people
AIBA World Boxing Championships medalists
Boxers at the 2018 Asian Games
Asian Games silver medalists for Kazakhstan
Asian Games medalists in boxing
Medalists at the 2018 Asian Games
Middleweight boxers
Boxers at the 2020 Summer Olympics
Olympic boxers of Kazakhstan
21st-century Kazakhstani people